Wan Romani bin Wan Salim is a Malaysian politician and currently serves as Kedah State Executive Councillor.

Election results

References 

1951 births
Living people
Malaysian people of Malay descent
Malaysian Islamic Party politicians
Members of the Kedah State Legislative Assembly
Kedah state executive councillors